Oharae no Kotoba (大祓のことば) is one of the Noritos (Shinto prayers or congratulatory words) in Shinto rituals. It is also called Nakatomi Saimon, Nakatomi Exorcism Words, or Nakatomi Exorcism for short, because it was originally used in the purification ceremony and the Nakatomi clan was solely responsible for reading it. A typical example can be found in Enki-Shiki, Volume 8, under the title June New Year's Eve Exorcism.  In general, the term "Daihourishi" refers to the words to be proclaimed to the participants of the event, while the term "Nakatomihourai" refers to a modified version of the words to be performed before the shrine or gods.

Overview 
For the formation of the Great Exorcism, Kamo Mabuchi advocated the Tenchi and Tenmu dynasties theory, and Hon'i Nobunaga advocates the Bunmu-tenso theory, but both theories state that the original text existed in earlier times.

It was originally chanted at the end of June and December every year to purge tsumi (Shinto concept of sin and pollution). In the past, it was used differently in June and December, but only the one in June remained. In the Enki-Shiki, it is described as "June New Year's Eve Exorcism," and the exorcism rituals used today are based on the "June New Year's Eve Exorcism" rituals.

In the Middle Ages it became associated with Onmyōdo and Esoteric Buddhism, and it came to be thought that merit (merit good luck gained from helping people or doing holy work in buddhism to attain buddha hood) could be gained by simply chanting it, like the incantations of Onmyōdō and Buddhist scriptures. In addition, it was believed that the more one chanted it, the more merit one would gain, and it came to be chanted thousands or tens of thousands of times, and in order to make it easier to chant, the "Saikyo Chushingurae" and the "Saikyo Chushingurae" were created, summarizing only the main points of the Daishoroshi. This was especially important in the Buddhist and Confucian Shinto mixed schools, and commentaries on the Daishoribito were written, such as "Chushin-hara-kunka" and "Chushin-hara-fusui-so.

Nowadays, in addition to being chanted by worshippers themselves at the time of the Great Exorcism, it is also chanted daily in front of the gods at Shinto shrines under the umbrella of the Jinja Honcho. In addition to the Jinja Honcho, it is also used by some of the various denominations of Shinto and Shinto-based new religions, but the content has been modified from that in the Enki Shiki, and there are sometimes differences between the denominations.

History 
There are several theories about the formation of the exorcism text. Some say that its author was Ametane-no-mikoto, the grandson of Tenko-no-mikoto, others say that it was Tokiwa-otairen, and still others say that Nakatomi Kanoren presented the exorcism text to Tenji and used it for the semi-annual exorcisms.

Exorcism is used for the purification ceremony. The purification ceremony is held at Suzaku-mon Gate in Kyoto on the last day of June and December every year to remove the various sins and impurities that have been unintentionally committed by all the people under heaven, including the 100 government officials, men and women. According to the Ritsuryo system, the Teikan ritual, and the Enki shiki, the central vassal of the imperial court offers masa, the east and west vassals offer exorcism knives, and read exorcism words in Chinese characters. After the exorcism is completed, the sixth rank and below are made to draw the marijuana.  In the Enki Shiki, Vol. 8, "Congratulatory Words," it is listed as "June New Year's Eve Exorcism," with the note, "December Junkono.

It is said that the text is excellent and magnificent, and its thought expresses an aspect of the national spirit. For this reason, it has been revered as a scripture of Shintoism since the Middle Ages, and it is believed that prayers can be accomplished by performing it before the gods. Thousand and ten thousand exorcisms were actively performed, and the Goshi distributed them among believers in imitation of Buddhist prayer scrolls (kanjus). Since ancient times, there have been many commentaries on these texts.

In addition to being held regularly as a semi-annual state ritual, exorcisms were also held on an ad hoc basis prior to the First Fruits Festival and in times of disaster or epidemic. On the other hand, Nakatomi-no-harae was a form of Shinto ritual in which the words of the exorcism were changed from being proclaimed to people to be played to the gods in order to convert them to private prayers, and is thought to have been established in the 10th century. The name "Nakatomi Exorcism" comes from the fact that it was read by the Nakatomi clan.

Nakatomi exorcism was used by the Department of Divinities to purify the emperor, and it can be confirmed that Onmyōjis used it for private prayers in the early 11th century. In the early 11th century, Onmyōjis used the exorcism for private prayer. and that the concluding phrase of the Nakatomi Exorcism, "The eight million gods will not pretend to hear.

The earliest known text of the Nakatomi Exorcism is the one entitled "Nakatomi Ritual Text" in the Asano-Gunzai, which was established in the early 12th century.  While the exorcism words of the Enki Shiki are words to be proclaimed to everyone, the Chushingomin Saibun of Asano Gunbai was changed to a form to be proclaimed to the gods, and can be read out by anyone, anywhere, at any time. According to the claim of Okada Yoneo, a researcher affiliated with the Agency for Divine Worship, the Asano-Gunbun's Chutomi-Saihumi is the oldest form of exorcism that is read before the gods as a prayer in modern times. What is noteworthy about Asano Gunnai's Chushingin ritual text is the description of "the eight million gods of Harato. The four gods of Harato appear in the exorcism, but in Asano-Gunbun's Chushingura, they are not limited to these four gods. The current version of the exorcism text, distributed by the Jinja Main Office, refers to the exorcism deities as "Amatsukami, Kunitsukami, and the eight million deities," and this is the oldest form of the exorcism text.

Eventually, Nakatomi exorcism seems to have spread to other countries. Among them, it has been revealed that Kasuga-sha was performing exorcism in the 12th century. In addition, Buddhist monks also began to perform rituals using Chushingin exorcism, and it is presumed that a commentary by Buddhist monks, Chushingin exorcism commentary, was established in the late Heian period.

The name "Chushinguraibun" seems to have been somewhat widely used from the end of the Heian period. After that, onmyoji and others began to perform the ritual of exorcism privately, and the exorcism poem came to be widely used in society as a congratulatory poem for regular rituals and prayers. Suzuki Shigetane's "Lectures on Celebration Words," vol. 10, explains the name of the exorcism as follows（現代語訳).It is also old-fashioned to refer to exorcisms as "Nakatomi exorcisms. However, since exorcism refers to an event, the correct term should be "Nakatomi exorcism. In the Kokugo Shiki, there is a verse that says, "I will have Amatsu-no-Mikoto and Kunitsu-no-Mikoto release you from your sins. It is correct to say that "Amatsu-sin" refers to the sins committed by the people of the country, and "Kokitsu-sin" refers to the sins committed by the people of the country.

In Ise Shinto, a unique method of exorcism was established by the beginning of the Kamakura period (1185-1333), and it became a secret from the late Kamakura period. In the Yoshida Shinto, the Nakatomi exorcism was also emphasized and unique rituals and notes were performed.

In the Middle Ages, along with the study of the Nihon Shoki Shinto scrolls, the study of Nakatomi no Horae progressed, and the belief in it deepened. The influence of the Ise Shinto and its five Shinto books was remarkable, and the influence of Ryobe Shinto and Sanno Shinto was also recognized. In the early days, the theory of Nakatomi's exorcism was cited in the analogous Shinto sources of the Doge's book, and the world refers to it as the work of Kūkai, but in fact it seems to have been made public in the late Kamakura period. The Nakatomi Exoteric Text in the Jingu Bunko collection is a transcription of an ancient manuscript from the early Kamakura period, dated June Kenpo 3 (1215). The same period was also used for the study of the same commentary on the exorcism by a person calling himself Fujiwara no Asomi Mikodayu. During the Muromachi period and Sengoku period, the Yoshida family of Kaguraoka, Kyoto, devoted the most attention to the study of Nakatomi's exorcisms, most notably by Yoshida Kanetomo. Kanetomo wrote the book "Nakatomi exorcism", and his son Kiyohara Nobuken wrote "Nakatomi exorcism". Kanetomo's descendants, Yoshida Kanenaga and Yoshida Kaneru, lectured on, promoted, copied, and disseminated both books.

Shinto Encyclopedia
From the end of the Heian period (794-1185) to the Edo period (1603-1868), the words read on a daily basis were called Nakatomi-haraishibushi, and the words read at the exorcism ceremony on the last day of June and December were called Dai-haraishibushi. Expressions differed in the ending and middle of the text between the exorcism text read at the exorcism ceremony and the Nakatomi exorcism text read on a daily basis. In the late Edo period (1603-1868), as Kokugaku (the study of the country) and Fuko-shinto (the ancient Shinto religion) flourished, the original name "Daihaishiki" came to be used again.

Content 
The June New Year's Eve Exorcism in the Enki-Shiki consists of the following three elements:

 To notify the government officials about the implementation of the Great Exorcism.
 Announce the process of exorcism, from the occurrence of sins by the people to the erasure of sins by the gods.
 Announce the instructions to the Urabe clan.

The exorcism verse can be divided into two main sections based on its content: the first section and the second section.

The first part begins with the phrase, "Listen carefully to the words of congratulation" to the royal family and 100 officials who have gathered for the exorcism. This is a remnant of the fact that the original exorcism lyrics were to be proclaimed to the participants, and this part is omitted in today's exorcism lyrics of the Jinja Main Office. Next, the content of Japanese mythology from the Peace of China in Reed Plains to the Descent of the Amaterasu and the reign of the Amaterasu over Japan is described. Then, the sins of the people of such a country are listed as Tensetsu-Sin, Kunitatsu-Sin, and the way to purify the sins when they occur is described. Since there are many sins that do not fit today's concept of "sin" and some of them may be taken as discriminatory, the Daihoshiki of the Jinja Main Office omits the list of sins and simply says "Amatsu-sin, Kunitsu-sin" (which was deleted in the Daihoshiki enacted by the Ministry of the Interior in 1914 and has been followed).

In the latter part of the chapter, it is explained how sins and impurities disappear when such purification is performed. After various metaphors are used to describe the disappearance of sins and impurities, the disappearance of the sins and impurities is described by the four purifying deities.

"Amatsu Shusshin no Taishu Shigi Ji" 
There has been debate over the interpretation of the phrase "tai shukushi no tai shukushi joto" at the end of the first sentence since the Edo period, when Kokugaku emerged.

Nen'ichi Motoyi argued in his "Post-exorcism Commentary" that "amatsu shukushi no tai shukushi koto" refers to the exorcism itself. Kamo Shin'abuchi expressed a similar opinion in "Shusshin Kō". The Ministry of Home Affairs, which had jurisdiction over Shinto shrines before the war, adopted this theory, and the Jinja Honcho, which follows in its footsteps, has also adopted this interpretation. The Jinja Main Office says that nothing is chanted between the first and second steps, but only one beat is left between them.

However, there is a theory that the "Amatsu Shusshin no Taishu Shigi Joto" is a secret shusshin that has been handed down since the time of the gods, and because it is a secret, it was not written in the Enki Shiki. Hirata Atsutane, a "posthumous student" of Hon'ichi Nobunaga, advocates the theory in his unfinished "Koshi-den" that "there is a congratulatory verse called "Amatsu-shukushi-no-taishugushi-joto" which was orally transmitted from Amaterasu, and was handed down only to the Nakatomi family. In his book, "Amatsu Shukushigi Ko," he claims that the words were uttered by Izanagi-no-mikoto when he purified himself at Abakihara in Tachibana-no-Kodo, Hyuga, Chikushi. This is what he wrote. The "Amatsu Shusshin no Tai Shusshin Joto" that Atsutane presented has been adopted as the "Amatsu Shusshin" by many Shinto schools other than the Jinja Main Office, and is chanted between the first and second stages of the Great Purification Speech, as well as being used as a stand-alone purification speech.

References

External link 
 大祓詞 - おはらいの文化史（國學院大學 伝統文化リサーチセンター資料館）

Shinto
Pages with unreviewed translations